John T. Denvir (1859–1943) was an American champion checker player, chess aficionado, author, and state legislator in Illinois. He served in the state senate from Chicago. He was a Democrat.

He published pamphlets and books on checkers including Denvir's Guide to Checkers.

References

1859 births
1943 deaths
American checkers players
Democratic Party Illinois state senators
20th-century American politicians
Politicians from Chicago